The Calvin–Rehoboth Robotic Observatory (obs. code: G98) is an astronomical observatory developed jointly between Calvin University (formerly Calvin College) in Michigan and Rehoboth Christian School in New Mexico, United States. It consists of identical telescopes, one on each campus.  Students at both schools use the telescopes as part of their study. The joint observatory has been in operation since 2004.

Since weather in Michigan is often problematic for visual astronomy, the joint observatory allows students at the college to operate the telescope in New Mexico remotely after having trained on the identical telescope locally.  It provides access to research quality scientific equipment and training for the high school students.

The observatory was used to discover several minor planets, including 145475 Rehoboth, which was named for the high school, where the Calvin–Rehoboth Robotic Observatory is located, while 134244 De Young was named for Mike De Young, a former science teacher at the Rehoboth Christian School.

List of discovered minor planets 

More than a hundred discovered minor planets are credited directly to the discovering observatory by the Minor Planet Center (as Calvin College or Prairie School).

See also 
 List of asteroid-discovering observatories

References

External links 
 Asteroids bear school, educator’s monikers, (134244) De Young, PDF

Minor-planet discovering observatories